Brian Patrick Lenihan (born 8 June 1994) is an Irish former professional footballer who played as a right back and midfielder.

Club career
Born in Cork, Lenihan began his career with College Corinthians. He moved to Cork City in July 2012, making a total of 27 League of Ireland appearances for them.

After receiving interest from a number of English clubs, he signed for Hull City on 31 August 2014. The transfer fee was believed to be £200,000.

He signed a one-month loan deal with Blackpool in November 2014. He made his debut on 8 November 2014 in a 3–1 away defeat to Leeds United. He returned to Hull on 25 November after sustaining a knee injury.

He made his debut for Hull on 30 April 2016 in a 1–0 away defeat to Bolton Wanderers.

On 18 April 2018, Lenihan announced his retirement from football at the age of 23, citing repeated injury problems as the main reason for his decision. He had been battling a recurring knee injury in the three years prior to his retirement, which saw him feature just twice for Hull City in the four years he was at the club. The last of those appearances came in a 2–0 EFL Cup loss to Doncaster Rovers where he was captain. Lenihan later revealed that he retired due to mental health issues which forced him to retire from the game after undergoing treatment in Manchester.

International career
Lenihan represented the Republic of Ireland under-19s.

Lenihan made his debut for the Republic of Ireland under-21s in May 2014. He was called up to the senior squad in November 2014. However, later that month he was sent back to the under-21s.

Career statistics

References

1994 births
Living people
Republic of Ireland association footballers
College Corinthians A.F.C. players
Cork City F.C. players
Hull City A.F.C. players
Blackpool F.C. players
League of Ireland players
English Football League players
Association football fullbacks
Association football midfielders
Republic of Ireland youth international footballers
Republic of Ireland under-21 international footballers
Republic of Ireland expatriate association footballers
Irish expatriate sportspeople in England
Expatriate footballers in England